Jack Trickey (24 January 1935 – 1 April 2022) was an Australian cyclist. He competed in the individual and team road race events at the 1956 Summer Olympics.

References

External links
 

1935 births
2022 deaths
Australian male cyclists
Olympic cyclists of Australia
Cyclists at the 1956 Summer Olympics